Samandar Rzayev (2 January 1945 — 27 March 1986) was an Azerbaijani actor. He was awarded the title Honored Artist of the Azerbaijan SSR (1974), and Laureate of the State Prize of the Azerbaijan SSR (1980).

Biography
Samandar Rzayev was born on January 2, 1945, in Agsu. He worked in a drama club in Agsu District. In 1964-1968 he studied at the faculty of drama and film acting of the Azerbaijan State Theater Institute named after Mirzaagha Aliyev. Adil Isgandarov, Mehdi Mammadov and Rza Tahmasib were his teachers. In 1968, while S.Rzayev was studying in the last year of the institute, he was admitted to the troupe of the Azerbaijan State Academic National Drama Theatre with the invitation of the chief director Tofig Kazimov. His first role was Horatio in William Shakespeare's Hamlet tragedy.

The actor died on March 27, 1986.

Awards
Honored Artist of the Azerbaijan SSR — 1 June 1974
State Prize of the Azerbaijan SSR — 1980

Filmography
Birthday
Babamizin Babasinin Babasi
Babek
Bagh Movsumu
Bayin Oghurlanmasi
Dali Kur
Evlari Kondalan Yar
Nesimi

References

Sources
 Azərbaycan Respublikası Mədəniyyət Nazirliyi. C.Cabbarlı adına "Azərbaycanfilm" kinostudiyası. Aydın Kazımzadə. Bizim "Azərbaycanfilm". 1923-2003-cü illər. Bakı: Mütərcim, 2004.- səh. 53.
 Hüseynov, F. “Bu kino ki var...”: Unudulmaz aktyor Səməndər Rzayevin xatirəsi yad edildi: [Dövlət Film Fondunda] //Mədəniyyət. - 2015.- 6 mart.- S.5.
 Kazımzadə, A. Kral Aktyor: [Əməkdar artist Səməndər Rzayev haqqında] //Kaspi.- 2015.- 14-16 mart.- S.14.

1945 births
1986 deaths
Azerbaijani actors
People from Agsu District
Soviet people
Honored Artists of the Azerbaijan SSR